The 1978 Holy Cross Crusaders football team was an American football team that represented the College of the Holy Cross as an independent during the 1978 NCAA Division I-A football season. Neil Wheelwright returned for his third year as head coach. The team compiled a record of 7–4.

All home games were played at Fitton Field on the Holy Cross campus in Worcester, Massachusetts.

Schedule

Statistical leaders
Statistical leaders for the 1978 Crusaders included: 
 Rushing: Crocky Nangle, 394 yards and 3 touchdowns on 89 attempts
 Passing: Peter Colombo, 1,432 yards, 103 completions and 7 touchdowns on 212 attempts
 Receiving: Chuck Mullen, 587 yards and 6 touchdowns on 40 receptions
 Scoring: Brian Doherty, 42 points from 7 touchdowns
 Total offense: Peter Colombo, 1,517 yards (1,432 passing, 85 rushing)
 All-purpose yards: Larry Ewald, 684 yards (392 rushing, 156 returning, 136 receiving)
 Interceptions: Glenn Verrette, 7 interceptions for 164 yards

References

Holy Cross
Holy Cross Crusaders football seasons
Holy Cross Crusaders football